Jean-Claude Garneau (born October 10, 1943) is a Canadian retired ice hockey forward who played 17 games in the World Hockey Association (WHA) for the Quebec Nordiques during the 1974–75 WHA season.

External links

1943 births
Canadian ice hockey right wingers
Ice hockey people from Quebec City
Living people
People from Sainte-Foy, Quebec City
Quebec Nordiques (WHA) players
Roanoke Valley Rebels (EHL) players
Salem Rebels (EHL) players